Francisco Javier Mar Hernández (December 4, 1926 – May 4, 2000) was a Mexican professional wrestler and promoter, known by the ring name "El Orgullo de Oriente" ("The pride of the Orient") Sugi Sito. He was born in Guanajuato to a Mexican father and Chinese mother. In the 1950s, Sito left Mexico and gained a measure of great success wrestling in the United States, especially the Houston, Texas area. In the early 1970s, Sugi Sito and Chin Lee worked for Stu Hart's Stampede Wrestling as a tag team. Sito later returned to Mexico where he became a wrestling promoter.

Professional wrestling career
Francisco Mar was trained by Rolando Vera for his professional wrestling career and made his debut in 1943. He adopted the ring name "Sugi Sito" to play off his mother's oriental ancestry, making him an instant Rudo during World War II. Sito's career highlights in Mexico came in the early part of the 1950s, as he was working for Empresa Mexicana de Lucha Libre (EMLL). On September 21, 1950 Sito defeated Tarzán López to win the NWA World Middleweight Championship, one of the most prestigious championships in Mexico at the time. Sito's first title reign lasted 368 days, ending when Enrique Llanes won the belt from him on September 24, 1951. Sito regained the Middleweight title in 1953 when he once again defeated López to win the title. This time he held it until January 1, 1954 when he was defeated by El Santo and lost the title. From 1954 and forward Sito travelled all over the United States and Canada to wrestle for various promotions. His first stop was in Texas where he worked for Southwest Sports, Inc. (the future World Class Championship Wrestling). Sito earned a reputation for having some of the hardest hand strikes in professional wrestling while working in Texas, a reputation that started when he accidentally fractured Danny McShain's skull during a match. He teamed up with another Mexican native in Rito Romero to win the NWA Texas Tag Team Championship from Ivan Kalmikoff and Karol Krauser. Due to sparse records from that time it is not known who defeated Sito and Romero for the titles. In the late 1960s Sito began working for Gulf Coast Championship Wrestling (GCCW) based out of Alabama. In GCCW he began teaming with Mitsu Sito, a storyline brother, defeating Rocket Monroe and Flash Monroe for the NWA Gulf Coast Tag Team Championship on February 21, 1969. The team only held the title for 5 days before being defeated by Bob Kelly and Ramon Perez. Following his stint in the south eastern United States Sito travelled north to Calgary, Alberta, Canada to work for Stu Hart's Stampede Wrestling. Over the course of the next two years Sito held the Calgary version of the NWA International Tag Team Championship three times, twice with Chin Lee and once with Tor Kamata.

Personal life
Francisco Mar Manuel was part of a large wrestling family. His three brothers (Huroki Sito, Panchito Robles and Manuel Robles) were all luchadores, as well as his son-in-law (El Mexicano), nephews (Black Cat, El Jabato and Pánico) and even his daughter who wrestles as La Briosa. Francisco Javier Mar died on May 4, 2000.

Championships and accomplishments
Empresa Mexicana de Lucha Libre
NWA World Middleweight Championship (2 times)
Gulf Coast Championship Wrestling
NWA Gulf Coast Tag Team Championship (1 time) – with Mitsu Sugi
Southwest Sports, Inc.
NWA Texas Tag Team Championship (1 time) - with Rito Romero
Stampede Wrestling
NWA International Tag Team Championship (Calgary version) (3 times) - with Chin Lee (2) and Tor Kamata (1)

Luchas de Apuestas record

References

Mexican male professional wrestlers
Mexican sportspeople of Chinese descent
Sportspeople from León, Guanajuato
Professional wrestlers from Guanajuato
1926 births
2000 deaths
Stampede Wrestling alumni
20th-century professional wrestlers
NWA World Middleweight Champions
Stampede Wrestling International Tag Team Champions